The John D. Haynes House is a house in Fort Wayne, Indiana, designed by Frank Lloyd Wright. The house is a small and modest Usonian design in glass, red tidewater cypress, and Chicago Common Brick on a red concrete slab.

The gallery is offset to meet the rear of the great room at its center, rather than typically to one side. A music room and three bedrooms drop off this gallery. The plan thus generated is an outside T, with great room facing southwest and southeast, bedrooms looking southeast to the morning sun. The gabled roofing is asymmetrical.

The house was designed inside the original layout of the Wildwood Park development which was designed by the noted American landscape architect, Arthur Asahel Shurcliff. The house was listed on the National Register of Historic Places in 2004, and the Historic Preservation Review Board declared the property a Local Historic District in April 2008, at the request of the out-of-state owner. In 2010, the owner, Richard Herber, asked the Historic Preservation Review Board to rescind the historic designation, a request they rejected, citing his failure to explain his change of mind as a factor in their decision. In 2016, he sued the city council and historic preservation commission in U.S. federal court, but the case was dismissed in March 2017.

References

Further reading
 Storrer, William Allin. The Frank Lloyd Wright Companion. University Of Chicago Press, 2006,  (S.323)
Frank Lloyd Wright Complete Works 1943–1959, by Bruce Brooks Pfeiffer and Peter Gössel (editor) (2009, Taschen). First in a series of three monographs featuring all of Wright's 1,100 designs, both realized and unrealized.

External links

Frank Lloyd Wright buildings
Houses completed in 1952
Houses on the National Register of Historic Places in Indiana
National Register of Historic Places in Fort Wayne, Indiana
Houses in Fort Wayne, Indiana
1952 establishments in Indiana